Mount Brown is an elongated rock peak protruding slightly above the continental ice, situated  east of the Vestfold Hills and  south-southwest of Cape Penck in Antarctica. It was delineated from aerial photos taken by U.S. Navy Operation Highjump (1946–47), and named by the Advisory Committee on Antarctic Names for Lieutenant (j.g.) Eduardo P. Brown, U.S. Navy, photographic officer for the Western Group of the expedition.

References
 
 

Mountains of Princess Elizabeth Land